Llanfihangel yn Nhowyn is a village in Anglesey, in north-west Wales. The church in the village, St Mihangel's, is a Grade II listed building and is the chapel for the nearby airbase, RAF Valley. It is in the community of Llanfair-yn-Neubwll

References

Villages in Anglesey
Llanfair-yn-Neubwll